How to Save a Life is the debut studio album by American alternative rock band The Fray. Released on September 14, 2005, through Epic Records, the record charted in the top 15 on the Billboard 200 and was a top ten hit in Australia, Canada, Ireland, New Zealand and the UK. The first two singles from the album, "Over My Head (Cable Car)"  and "How to Save a Life" helped the album become a commercial success and brought the band mainstream popularity.

Critical reception to the album was mixed. The piano-rock style of the album drew comparisons with British piano-driven bands like Keane and Coldplay. The album was certified double platinum by the RIAA, and was also certified platinum in Australia, Canada, New Zealand and in the UK. The album went on to become the best-selling digital album of all time, breaking the record held previously by Coldplay's X&Y. It was ranked #21 on Billboard'''s list of the Best Digital Albums of the Decade.

Background
After independently releasing two EPs, The Fray were looking for a record company to release a full-length album. The band released their song "Cable Car" to Denver radio station KTCL, and the song saw significant airplay. Denver alternative newsweekly Westword'' named the band "Best New Band" in 2004, and this prompted Epic Records A&R man Mike Flynn to sign the band to a recording contract on December 17, 2004. The album was recorded over six weeks in Echo Park Studios in Bloomington, Indiana, and was produced by Aaron Johnson and Mike Flynn. Former bass guitar player Dan Battenhouse left the band a year before entering the studio; Jake Smith, former lead singer and guitarist of the band The Mysteries of Life, took over bass guitar duties.

Track listing

In later editions, an extra track was added:

"Unsaid" – 3:05

Bonus CD
"Over My Head (Cable Car)" (Live at the Gothic (May 20, 2005))
"How to Save a Life"  (Live for MTV.com & VH1.com (July 14, 2005))
"Look After You" (Live at Red Rocks (08.12.2005))
"Heaven Forbid" (Live at Red Rocks (08.12.2005))
Bonus DVD
How to Save a Life (The Story)
On The Road 2006 (Documentary)
"Over My Head (Cable Car)" (Music Video)
"Over My Head (Cable Car)" (Making the video)

Personnel 
The Fray
 Isaac Slade – lead vocals, acoustic piano
 Dave Welsh – lead guitars
 Joe King – rhythm guitars, backing vocals, lead vocals on "Heaven Forbid"
 Ben Wysocki – drums, percussion

Additional musicians
 Jake Smith – bass 
 Dan Battenhouse – bass on "How to Save a Life"
 Suzie Katayama – string arrangements and conductor on "Look After You"

Production 
 Mike Flynn – producer, A&R 
 Aaron Johnson – producer, additional engineer 
 Paul Mahern – recording, Pro Tools editing
 Kevin Loyal – recording assistant 
 James Masterson – recording assistant 
 Tim Hoagland – additional engineer
 Warren Huart – additional Pro Tools editing, drum recording (3)
 Clark Germain – string recording (7)
 Mark Endert – mixing at Scream Studios (Studio City, California)
 Alex Uychocde – mix assistant 
 Stephen Marcussen – mastering at Marcussen Mastering (Hollywood, California)
 Michelle Holme – art direction 
 Nathan Johnson – front and back cover artwork 
 Zach Johnson – hand lettering 
 The Crackerfarm – packaging 
 Jason Ienner – management
 Gregg Latterman – management

Release
The album was released on September 13, 2005 by Epic Records. While the album did not make a splash commercially or critically initially, the success of "Over My Head (Cable Car)" propelled the album from the Top Heatseekers chart to the top 20 of The Billboard 200 chart. The release of the second single, "How to Save a Life", a world-wide smash, helped the album enter the top 5 in several charts across the world, and brought The Fray mainstream popularity. The song remains the band's best known and most successful song to date.

Singles
"Over My Head (Cable Car)" was released as the first single from the album, and it became a top 40 hit on the Modern Rock Tracks chart in late 2005. It lasted three weeks on the chart and peaked at position #37. The song peaked at #8 on the Billboard Hot 100 chart. On the Billboard Adult Top 40 chart, the single reached the #2 position. Internationally, the song was a Top 25 hit in Australia, Canada, Denmark, Ireland, New Zealand and the UK. The song was the fifth-most downloaded single of 2006.
"How to Save a Life" was released as the second single from the album. The song reached the top three of the Billboard Hot 100 chart, surpassing the peak position of "Over My Head (Cable Car)". It became the joint sixth longest charting single of all time on the Billboard Hot 100, tying with Santana's "Smooth", at 58 consecutive weeks. The song also topped the Adult Top 40 chart for 15 consecutive weeks. "How to Save a Life" became a major hit internationally, topping the singles chart in Ireland, Spain and Canada. The song also charted in the top five in Australia, Italy, Sweden and in the UK Singles Chart.
"Look After You" was released as the band's third single; the song peaked at position 59 in the Billboard Hot 100, becoming the band's first single to miss the Top 40. The song peaked at #49 on Billboard Pop 100 and at #12 on the Hot Adult Top 40 Tracks.
"All at Once" was released as the fourth and final single from the album. It peaked at #20 on the Hot Adult Top 40 Tracks chart.

Critical reception

Overall, critical reception for the album was mixed. The piano-oriented sound of the album drew comparisons with British piano-rock band Keane, and Coldplay (whose music – although classified as alternative – is driven by the piano).

AllMusic, whilst giving the album a modestly positive review, stated that the band "lacked originality" and the album itself lacked any "inspiration and excitement". Stylus Magazine gave the album a negative review, stating "The Fray, as a rule, are moribund, emotionally strained, uninvolving, and have a tendency to sound like The Cranberries fronted by a man."
Rolling Stone and Blender echoed many of these statements, both giving the album three stars out of five.

Awards and nominations
 The album won all three awards in the digital category at the 2006 Billboard Music Awards: Digital Album of the Year, Digital Album Artist of the Year  and Digital Songs Artist of the Year  while the band was nominated for New Artist of the Year.
 The first two singles, "Over My Head (Cable Car)" and "How to Save a Life" were nominated for a Grammy Award for Best Pop Performance by a Duo or Group with Vocal and Grammy Award for Best Rock Performance by a Duo or Group with Vocal respectively in 2007.
 The band was also nominated for a Choice Music: Breakout Group award at the 2007 Teen Choice Awards.

Samples

Charts

Weekly charts

Year-end charts

Certifications

References

External links
Official band website

The Fray albums
2005 debut albums
Epic Records albums